St. George's Episcopal Church, or variants thereof, may refer to:

 St. George Episcopal Church (Jacksonville), Florida
 St. George's Episcopal Church (Le Mars, Iowa)
 St. George's Episcopal Church (Valley Lee, Maryland)
 St. George's Anglican Church (Helmetta, New Jersey), known until 2010 as St. George's Episcopal Church
 St. George's Protestant Episcopal Church (Brooklyn)
 St. George's Episcopal Church (Hempstead, New York)
 St. George's Episcopal Church (Manhattan)
 St. George's Episcopal Church (Fredericksburg, Virginia)
 St. George's Episcopal Church (Griffin, Georgia), listed on the NRHP in Georgia
 St. George's Episcopal Church (Austin, Nevada)

See also
 St George's Church (disambiguation)